may refer to:

Places
 Kasuga, Fukuoka, a city in Fukuoka Prefecture, Japan
 Kasuga Station (Fukuoka), on the Kagoshima Main Line
 Kasuga, Hyogo, a former town in Hyōgo Prefecture
 Kasuga, Gifu, a former village in Gifu Prefecture
 Kasuga Shrine, a major Shinto shrine in Nara
 Kasugayama Castle, the primary fortress of warlord Uesugi Kenshin
 Kasuga Station (Tokyo), on the Toei Subway Mita Line and Ōedo Line

Ships
 , also called Kasuga Maru, a Japanese wooden paddle steamer warship of the Bakumatsu and early Meiji period
 , an armored cruiser of the Imperial Japanese Navy during the Russo-Japanese War
 Kasuga-class cruiser, armored cruisers of the Imperial Japanese Navy, in commission 1904–1945
 , also called Japanese Pacific Ocean liner Kasuga Maru, a Taiyō-class escort carrier of the Imperial Japanese Navy during World War II

People with the surname
 Carlos Kasuga, Japanese-Mexican businessman
 Hachiro Kasuga (1924–1991), Japanese singer
 Kanon Kasuga (born 2003), Japanese actress
 Lady Kasuga or Kasuga no Tsubone (1579–1643)
 Toshiaki Kasuga (born 1979), Japanese comedian
 Shōjirō Kasuga (1903–1976), Japanese communist activist
 Ichiban Kasuga, a character from the Yakuza series

Other uses
 7674 Kasuga, a main-belt asteroid
 Kasuga-dōrō, a type of Japanese Tōrō (stone lantern)

See also
Haruhi, which can be written with the same kanji
Kasukabe, a city in Saitama

Japanese-language surnames